Rockpalast (Rock Palace) is a German music television show that broadcasts live on German television station Westdeutscher Rundfunk (WDR). Rockpalast started in 1974 and continues to this day. Hundreds of rock, heavy metal and jazz bands have performed on Rockpalast. Some acts were recorded for broadcast and for retail sale. All-night marathon shows called “Rock Night” (Rocknacht) were produced once or twice a year from 1977 through 1986 and simulcast throughout Europe via the Eurovision network of TV broadcasters, thereby reaching around 25 million listeners on average.

Soon, Alan Bangs and Albrecht Metzger joined as hosts of the  events.

The J. Geils Band's song "Believe in Me" became the official Rockpalast intro tune ever since their first broadcast in 1976.

Selected list of performers

Not all of these acts were recorded and broadcast. A list of the recorded gigs is readable on the Rockpalast homepage.

 Agnostic Front
 ...And You Will Know Us by the Trail of Dead
 Airbourne
 All Them Witches
 Alpha Blondy
 Alter Bridge
 Apocalyptica
 Audioslave
 Joan Armatrading
 Aswad
 Anvil
 Bad Religion
 Band of Heathens
 Band of Horses
 BAP
 Dickey Betts
 Motörhead
 Black Pumas
 The Beards
 The Beat
 Adrian Belew
 Big Country
 Big Sugar
 The Black Crowes 
 Blackberry Smoke
 Black Francis
 Black Stone Cherry
 Black Uhuru
 Blues Pills
 Joe Bonamassa
 The Bouncing Souls
 David Bowie
 Boysetsfire
 Billy Bragg
 The Brew
 The Brian Jonestown Massacre
 Edgar Broughton Band
 Jackson Browne
 Jack Bruce
 Roy Buchanan
 Bullet for My Valentine
 Mr. Bungle
 Eric Burdon
 Burning Spear
 Paul Butterfield
 John Cale
 Carmel
 Paul Carrack
 Harry Chapin
 Roger Chapman
 Cheap Trick
 Neneh Cherry
 Chicago
 Tim Christensen
 Chumbawamba
 Jimmy Cliff
 George Clinton and Parliament-Funkadelic
 Cold Chisel
 Colour Haze
 Graham Coxon
 Kevin Coyne
 Cutting Crew
 Ry Cooder
 Elvis Costello and the Attractions
 The Cult
 The Cure
 Charlie Daniels Band
 Death Cab for Cutie
 Deftones
 Dexys Midnight Runners
 Dire Straits 
 Dispatch
 Dizzy Mizz Lizzy
 Doro
 Dr. Hook & the Medicine Show
 dredg
 Duran Duran
 Ian Dury and The Blockheads
 Eagles of Death Metal
 Earth, Wind and Fire
 Echo & the Bunnymen
 Edguy
 Einstürzende Neubauten
 Electric Light Orchestra
 Enter Shikari
 Epica
 Evanescence
 Every Time I Die
 Explosions in the Sky
 John Fahey
 Faith No More
 The Flaming Lips
 Fleet Foxes
 Flogging Molly
 The Flower Kings
 Robben Ford
 The Frames
 Fun Boy Three
 Peter Gabriel 
 Rory Gallagher 
 Gang of Four
 Garbage
 Golden Earring
 Gov't Mule
 Grateful Dead
 Grobschnitt
 Gruppo Sportivo
 Guano Apes
 Guns N' Roses
 Guru Guru
 Nina Hagen
 Peter Hammill
 Roy Harper
 George Harrison 
 Heaven & Hell
 HIM
 Jay Hooks.
 Bruce Hornsby
 Ben Howard
 Ian Hunter and Mick Ronson
 Billy Idol
 Incubus
 In Flames
 Interpol
 INXS
 Iron Maiden
 Linkin Park
 Joe Jackson
 The Jam 
 Rick James and The Stone City Band
 Al Jarreau
 Jimmy Eat World
 Johnny Clegg and Juluka
 JPNSGRLS
 Mickey Jupp
 Michael Karoli
 The Kelly Family
 B.B. King
 King's X
 Kings of Convenience
 Killing Joke
 Kings of Leon
 The Kinks
 David Knopfler
 Leo Kottke
 Kula Shaker
 Kyuss
 L7
 Lagwagon
 Ronnie Lane from The Faces
 Jonny Lang
 Alvin Lee and Ten Years After
 Level 42
 Huey Lewis and the News
 Aynsley Lister
 Little Feat
 Little Steven
 Nils Lofgren
 The Lords of the New Church
 Louisiana Red
 Lynyrd Skynyrd
 Machine Head
 Madness
 Magazine
 Manic Street Preachers
 Marilyn Manson
 Bob Marley & The Wailers
 The Mars Volta
 John Martyn
 Carolyne Mas
 Dave Matthews Band
 Meat Loaf 
 Men at Work
 Natalie Merchant
 Steve Miller
 Mink DeVille
 Mondo Generator
 Van Morrison
 Mother's Finest
 Muddy Waters
 Muse
 My Chemical Romance
 Gianna Nannini
 Nena
 NOFX
 Ted Nugent
 Sinéad O'Connor
 The Offspring
 Mike Oldfield
 Angel Olsen
 Oomph!
 Satyricon (band)
 Otherkin
 Outlaws 
 Peter Gabriel
 Papa Roach
 Parkway Drive
 Tom Petty and the Heartbreakers
 Phish
 Point Blank 
 The Police
 Porcupine Tree
 Powerwolf
 Pretenders
 The Pretty Things
 Primus
 Public Image Limited
 Queens of the Stone Age
 R.E.M.
 Radiohead
 Rainbow
 Rammstein
 Marion Raven
 Red Hot Chili Peppers
 Return To Forever
 Rockpile
 Linda Ronstadt
 Todd Rundgren
 Mitch Ryder And The Detroit Wheels
 Saint Jude
 David Sancious
 Michael Schenker Group
 Screaming Trees
 Shinedown
 Silverchair
 Simple Minds
 Siouxsie and the Banshees
 Smashing Pumpkins
 Patti Smith
 The Smiths 
 Sniff 'n' the Tears 
 Slipknot
 Social Distortion
 Sonic Syndicate
 Sonic Youth
 Soundgarden
 Southside Johnny
 Spirit
 Spock's Beard
 Stiff Little Fingers
 Stranglers
 Stray Cats
 Streetwalkers
 Talking Heads
 Mick Taylor
 Tears for Fears
 Téléphone
 Them Crooked Vultures
 Therapy?
 The The
 Thin Lizzy
 Richard Thompson
 Thumb
 Trust
 Turbonegro
 Eddie Turner
 U2
 UB40
 UFO
 Utopia
 Midge Ure
 Van der Graaf Generator
 Velvet Revolver
 Stevie Ray Vaughan and Double Trouble
 Villagers 
 Andreas Vollenweider 
 Tom Waits
 Weather Report
 Weezer
 The Who
 Wille and the Bandits
 Wilco
 Ray Wilson
 Edgar Winter 
 Johnny Winter
 Wire
 Wucan
 XTC
 The XX
 The Zutons
 ZZ Top
 The Deadnotes

See also 
 Top of the Pops

References

Further reading

External links

 Official website 
 Westdeutscher Rundfunk 
 Rockpalast-Archiv Unofficial archive website
 
 Rockpalast-Fans Unofficial fansite
 Rockpalast on Last.fm user group with free radio station

1974 German television series debuts
1980s German television series
1990s German television series
2000s German television series
2010s German television series
German music television series
German-language television shows
Das Erste original programming